Cyril Kemp (14 August 1904 – 14 June 1964) was  a former Australian rules footballer who played with Fitzroy and North Melbourne in the Victorian Football League (VFL).

Notes

External links 
		

1904 births
1964 deaths
Australian rules footballers from Victoria (Australia)
Fitzroy Football Club players
North Melbourne Football Club players